Caryńskie  ( Tsaryns’ke) is a village in the administrative district of Gmina Lutowiska, within Bieszczady County, Subcarpathian Voivodeship, in south-eastern Poland, close to the border with Ukraine.

The village has a population of 3.

References

Villages in Bieszczady County